Laura Lanes (born 17 April 1998) is a para-badminton player.

Lanes competed at the 2019 Parapan American Games where she won a silver medal in the mixed doubles SL3-SU5 event alongside Rolando Bello and a bronze medal in the women's singles SU5 event.

References

1998 births
Living people
Cuban female badminton players
Medalists at the 2019 Parapan American Games
Cuban para-badminton players
21st-century Cuban women